Katrina Chen (born 14 July 1983) is a Canadian politician who has represented the electoral district of Burnaby-Lougheed in the Legislative Assembly of British Columbia in 2017. A member of the British Columbia New Democratic Party (BC NDP) caucus, she was Minister of State for Child Care from 2017 to 2022.

Early life and career 
Chen was raised in Taichung, Taiwan, where her father was a member of the city council.

She has served as a trustee on the Burnaby Board of Education, and worked in both provincial and federal government constituency offices for over 10 years. She has a bachelor of arts degree with a political science major and a history minor from Simon Fraser University, and also earned a certificate in immigration laws, policies and procedures from the University of British Columbia. She has also worked as a community organizer with ACORN, emceed for major cultural festivals, and volunteered as an executive member for several local non-profit organizations for many years.

Political career 
Chen was first elected to the legislature in the 2017 British Columbia general election. After the NDP formed government, Chen was appointed to the cabinet of John Horgan as Minister of State for Child Care.

During her time as a Cabinet Minister, Chen led the Child Care BC plan to start a new social program in BC - an affordable, quality, inclusive early learning and care system for all families, and successfully negotiated the first Canada-Wide early learning agreement with the federal government with billions of new funding for child care.  

As part of an initiative to increase the number of early childhood educators in the province, she has championed dual-credit programs throughout BC which will allow grade 11 and 12 students to earn post secondary credits toward early childhood careers.

After Horgan announced his retirement as premier and party leader, Chen was suggested by pundits as a possible candidate in the party leadership election. Instead, she endorsed David Eby, doing so before Eby had announced his intentions. After Eby formally announced his leadership bid, Chen joined as co-chair of his campaign, alongside Ravi Kahlon.

After Eby was successful in his leadership bid and sworn-in as premier, Chen was speculated to receive a major role in his cabinet. However, Chen declined to join the new cabinet, and stepped down in order to deal with long-term trauma.

Electoral record

References

British Columbia New Democratic Party MLAs
British Columbia school board members
1983 births
Women government ministers of Canada
Living people
Members of the Executive Council of British Columbia
Women MLAs in British Columbia
People from Burnaby
Taiwanese emigrants to Canada
21st-century Canadian politicians
21st-century Canadian women politicians
Politicians from Taichung
Canadian politicians of Chinese descent